Sutton SignWriting, or simply SignWriting, is a system of writing sign languages. It is highly featural and visually iconic, both in the shapes of the characters, which are abstract pictures of the hands, face, and body, and in their spatial arrangement on the page, which does not follow a sequential order like the letters that make up written English words. It was developed in 1974 by Valerie Sutton, a dancer who had, two years earlier, developed DanceWriting. Some newer standardized forms are known as the International Sign Writing Alphabet (ISWA).

History
As Sutton was teaching DanceWriting to the Royal Danish Ballet, Lars von der Lieth, who was doing research on sign language at the University of Copenhagen, thought it would be useful to use a similar notation for the recording of sign languages. Sutton based SignWriting on DanceWriting, and finally expanded the system to the complete repertoire of MovementWriting. However, only SignWriting and DanceWriting have been widely used.

Although not the first writing system for sign languages (see Stokoe notation), SignWriting is the first to adequately represent facial expressions and shifts in posture, and to accommodate representation of series of signs longer than compound words and short phrases. It is the only system in regular use, used for example to publish college newsletters in American Sign Language, and has been used for captioning of YouTube videos. Sutton notes that SignWriting has been used or investigated in over 40 countries on every inhabited continent. However, it is not clear how widespread its use is in each country.

In Brazil, during the FENEIS (National Association of the Deaf) annual meeting in 2001, the association voted to accept SignWriting as the preferred method of transcribing Lingua Brasileira de Sinais (Libras) into a written form. The strong recommendation to the Brazilian government from that association was that SignWriting be taught in all Deaf schools. Currently SignWriting is taught on an academic level at the Federal University of Santa Catarina as part of its Brazilian Sign Language curriculum.  SignWriting is also being used in the recently published Brazilian Sign Language Dictionary containing more than 3,600 signs used by the deaf of São Paulo, published by the University of São Paulo under the direction of Prof. Fernando Capovilla (EJ669813 – Brazilian Sign Language Lexicography and Technology: Dictionary, Digital Encyclopedia, Chereme-based Sign Retrieval, and Quadriplegic Deaf Communication Systems. Abstracted from Educational Resources Information Center).

Some initial studies found that Deaf communities prefer video or writing systems for the dominant language, however this claim has been disputed by the work of Steve and Dianne Parkhurst in Spain where they found initial resistance, later renewed interest, and finally pride. "If Deaf people learn to read and write in their own signing system, that increases their self-esteem", says Dianne Parkhurst.

, SignWriting is widely used at International Sign forums. It is adopted in as many as 40 countries, among which are Brazil, Ethiopia, France, Germany, Italy, Portugal, Saudi Arabia, Slovenia, Tunisia, and the United States.

SignWriting, as the International Sign Writing Alphabet (ISWA), has been proposed as the manual equivalent to the International Phonetic Alphabet. However, some researchers argue that the SignWriting is not a phonemic orthography and does not have a one-to-one map from phonological forms to written forms. Although such a claim is disputed, it has been recommended that countries adapt this sign on a language-by-language basis. There are two doctoral dissertations that study and promote the application of SignWriting to a specific sign language. Maria Galea wrote about using SignWriting to write Maltese Sign Language. Also, Claudia Savina Bianchini wrote her doctoral dissertation on the implementation of SignWriting to write Italian Sign Language.

Symbols
In SignWriting, a combination of iconic symbols for handshapes, orientation, body locations, facial expressions, contacts, and movement are used to represent words in sign language. Since SignWriting, as a featural script, represents the actual physical formation of signs rather than their meaning, no phonemic or semantic analysis of a language is required to write it.  A person who has learned the system can "feel out" an unfamiliar sign in the same way an English speaking person can "sound out" an unfamiliar word written in the Latin alphabet, without even needing to know what the sign means.

The number of symbols is extensive and often provides multiple ways to write a single sign. Just as it took many centuries for English spelling to become standardized, spelling in SignWriting is not yet standardized for any sign language.

Words may be written from the point of view of the signer or the viewer. However, almost all publications use the point of view of the signer, and assume the right hand is dominant. Sutton originally designed the script to be written horizontally (left-to-right), like English, and from the point of view of the observer, but later changed it to vertical (top-to-bottom) and from the point of view of the signer, to conform to the wishes of Deaf writers.

Orientation

The orientation of the palm is indicated by filling in the glyph for the hand shape. A hollow outline (white) glyph indicates that one is facing the palm of the hand, a filled (black) glyph indicates that one is facing the back of the hand, and split shading indicates that one is seeing the hand from the side. Although in reality the wrist may turn to intermediate positions, only the four orientations of palm, back, and either side are represented in SignWriting, as they are enough to represent sign languages.

If an unbroken glyph is used, then the hand is placed in the vertical (wall or face) plane in front of the signer, as occurs when finger spelling. A band erased across the glyph through the knuckles shows that the hand lies in the horizontal plane, parallel to the floor. (If one of the basic hand-shape glyphs is used, such as the simple square or circle, this band breaks it in two; however, if there are lines for fingers extended from the base, then they become detached from the base, but the base itself remains intact.)

The diagram to the left shows a BA-hand (flat hand) in six orientations. For the three vertical orientations on the left side, the hand is held in front of the signer, fingers pointing upward. All three glyphs can be rotated, like the hands of a clock, to show the fingers pointing at an angle, to the side, or downward. For the three horizontal orientations on the right side of the diagram, the hand is held outward, with the fingers pointing away from the signer, and presumably toward the viewer. They can also be rotated to show the fingers pointing to the side or toward the signer. Although an indefinite number of orientations can be represented this way, in practice only eight are used for each plane—that is, only multiples of 45° are found.

Hand shapes

There are over a hundred glyphs for hand shapes, but all the ones used in ASL are based on five basic elements:
A square represents a closed fist, with the knuckles of the flexed fingers bent 90° so that the fingers touch the palm and the thumb lies over the fingers. Unadorned, this square represents the S hand of fingerspelling. Modified as described below, it indicates that at least one of the four fingers touches the palm of the hand.
A circle represents an "open fist", a hand where the thumb and fingers are flexed so as to touch at their tips. Unadorned, this is the O hand of fingerspelling. Modified, it indicates that at least one finger touches the thumb this way.
A pentagon (triangle atop a rectangle), as in the illustration used for the Orientation section above, represents a flat hand, where all fingers are straight and in contact. This is similar to the B hand of fingerspelling, though without the thumb crossing over the palm.
A 'C' shape represents a hand where the thumb and fingers are curved, but not enough to touch. This is used for the C hand of fingerspelling, and can be modified to show that the fingers are spread apart.
An angled shape, like a fat L, shows that the four fingers are flat (straight and in contact), but bent at 90° from the plane of the palm. It does not occur as a simple shape, but must include an indication of where the thumb is, either out to the side or touching the tips of the fingers.

A line halfway across the square or pentagon shows the thumb across the palm. These are the E, B, and (with spread fingers) 4 hands of fingerspelling.

These basic shapes are modified with lines jutting from their faces and corners to represent fingers that are not positioned as described above. Straight lines represent straight fingers (these may be at an angle to indicate that they are not in line with the palm; if they point toward or away from the signer, they have a diamond shape at the tip); curved lines for curved (cupped) fingers; hooked lines for hooked fingers; right-angle lines, for fingers bent at only one joint; and crossed lines, for crossed fingers, as shown in the chart at right. The pentagon and C are only modified to show that the fingers are spread rather than in contact; the angle is only modified to show whether the thumb touches the finger tips or juts out to the side. Although there are some generalizations which can be made for the dozens of other glyphs, which are based on the circle and square, the details are somewhat idiosyncratic and each needs to be memorized.

For the top sign, the arrows show that the two '1' hands move in vertical circles, and that although they move at the same time (tie bar), the left hand (hollow arrowhead) starts away from the body (thin line) going up while the right hand (solid arrowhead) starts near the body (thick line) going down.

With the bottom sign, the right 'X' palm-down hand moves down-side-down relative to the stationary palm-up 'B' hand. This is overly exact: The ASL sign will work with any downward zigzag motion, and the direction and starting point of the circles is irrelevant.

Finger movement
There are only a few symbols for finger movement. They may be doubled to show that the movement is repeated.

A solid bullet represents flexing the middle joint of a finger or fingers, and a hollow bullet represents straightening a flexed finger. That is, a 'D' hand with a solid bullet means that it becomes an 'X' hand, while an 'X' hand with a hollow bullet means that it becomes a 'D' hand. If the fingers are already flexed, then a solid bullet shows that they squeeze. For example, a square (closed fist, 'S' hand) with double solid bullets is the sign for 'milk' (iconically squeezing an udder).

A downward-pointing chevron represents flexing at the knuckles, while an upward-pointing chevron (^) shows that the knuckles straighten. That is, a 'U' hand with a down chevron becomes an 'N' hand, while and 'N' hand with an up chevron becomes a 'U' hand.

A zigzag like two chevrons (^^) joined means that the fingers flex repeatedly and in sync. A double-line zigzag means that the fingers wriggle or flutter out of sync.

Hand movement
Hundreds of arrows of various sorts are used to indicate movement of the hands through space. Movement notation gets quite complex, and because it is more exact than it needs to be for any one sign language, different people may choose to write the same sign in different ways.

For movement with the left hand, the Δ-shaped arrowhead is hollow (white); for movement with the right hand, it is solid (black). When both hands move as one, an open (Λ-shaped) arrowhead is used.

As with orientation, movement arrows distinguish two planes: Movement in the vertical plane (up & down) is represented by arrows with double stems, as at the bottom of the diagram at left, while single-stemmed arrows represent movement parallel to the floor (to & fro). In addition, movement in a diagonal plane uses modified double-stemmed arrows: A cross bar on the stem indicates that the motion is away as well up or down, and a solid dot indicates approaching motion. To & fro movement that also goes over or under something uses modified single-stemmed arrows, with the part of the arrow representing near motion thicker than the rest. These are iconic, but conventionalized, and so need to be learned individually.

Straight movements are in one of eight directions for either plane, as in the eight principal directions of a compass. A long straight arrow indicates movement from the elbow, a short arrow with a cross bar behind it indicates motion from the wrist, and a simple short arrow indicates a small movement. (Doubled, in opposite directions, these can show nodding from the wrist.) A secondary curved arrow crossing the main arrow shows that the arm twists while it moves. (Doubled, in opposite directions, these can show shaking of the hand.) Arrows can turn, curve, zigzag, and loop-the-loop.

Shoulder, head, and eye movement
Arrows on the face at the eyes show the direction of gaze.

Contact

Six contact glyphs show hand contact with the location of the sign. That is, a handshape glyph located at the side of the face, together with a contact glyph, indicates that the hand touches the side of the face. The choice of the contact glyph indicates the manner of the contact:
 an asterisk (∗ or *) for simply touching the place;
 a plus sign (+) for grasping the place (usually the other hand);
 a pound/hash sign (#) for striking the place;
 a circle with a dot inside (⊙) for brushing along the place and then leaving it;
 a spiral (꩜ or may be approximated with @) for rubbing the place and not leaving; if there is no additional arrow, this is understood to be in circles; and
 two bars on either side of a contact symbol (|∗|) to indicate the contact happens between elements of the place of contact; usually between fingers, or inside a circular hand shape. (A contact other than the basic asterisk is rarely used between bars.)

Location
If the signing hand is located at the other hand, the symbol for it is one of the hand shapes above. In practice, only a subset of the more simple hand shapes occurs.

Additional symbols are used to represent sign locations at the face or body parts other than the hands. A circle shows the head.

Expression
There are symbols to represent facial movements that are used in various sign languages, including eyes, eyebrows, nose movements, cheeks, mouth movements, and breathing changes. The direction of head movement and eyegaze can also be shown.

Body movement
Shoulders are shown with a horizontal line.  Small arrows can be added to show shoulder and torso movement.  Arms and even legs can be added if necessary.

Prosody
There are also symbols that indicate speed of movement, whether movement is simultaneous or alternating, and punctuation.

Punctuation
Various punctuation symbols exist that correspond to commas, periods, question and exclamation marks, and other punctuation symbols of other scripts.  These are written between signs, and lines do not break between a sign and its following punctuation symbol.

Arrangement of symbols

One of the unusual characteristics of SignWriting is its use of two-dimensional layout within an invisible 'sign box'.  The relative positions of the symbols within the box iconically represent the locations of the hands and other parts of the body involved in the sign being represented.  As such, there is no obvious linear relationship between the symbols within each sign box, unlike the sequence of characters within each word in most scripts for spoken languages.  This is also unlike other sign language scripts which arrange symbols linearly as in spoken languages.  However, since in sign languages many phonetic parameters are articulated simultaneously, these other scripts require arbitrary conventions for specifying the order of different parameters of handshape, location, motion, etc.  Although SignWriting does have conventions for how symbols are to be arranged relative to each other within a sign, the two-dimensional layout results in less arbitrariness and more iconicity than other sign language scripts.

Outside of each sign, however, the script is linear, reflecting the temporal order of signs.  Signs are most commonly now written in vertical columns (although formerly they were written horizontally).  Sign boxes are arranged from top to bottom within the column, interspersed with punctuation symbols, and the columns progress left to right across the page.  Within a column, signs may be written down the center or shifted left or right in 'lanes' to indicate side-to-side shifts of the body.

Sequencing of signs in dictionaries
Sutton orders signs in ten groups based on which fingers are extended on the dominant hand. These are equivalent to the numerals one through ten in ASL. Each group is then subdivided according to the actual hand shape, and then subdivided again according to the plane the hand is in (vertical, then horizontal), then again according to the basic orientation of the hand (palm, side, back).  An ordering system has been proposed using this beginning and examples from both American Sign Language and Brazilian Sign Language (LIBRAS). The current system of ordering for SignWriting is called the Sign Symbol Sequence which is parsed by the creator of each sign as recorded into the on-line dictionary.  This system allows for internal ordering by features including handshape, orientation, speed, location, and other clustered features not found in spoken dictionaries.

Advantages and disadvantages
Some of the advantages of SignWriting, compared to other writing systems for sign languages, are:
Its iconicity makes it easy to learn to read, in particular the iconicity that results from layout in two dimensions instead of just one.
It has detailed mechanisms for representing facial expression and other non-manuals.
It has been adapted for use with many different sign languages. 
However, it has a few disadvantages as well:
The sheer size of its symbol set and the fine details which can be written create a challenge in learning how to write. It also means that the written form is largely situational and inventive; different people may write the same sign different ways, and a single person may alternate between transcriptions. 
The two-dimensional spatial layout of SignWriting symbols within each sign, although it is more iconic than a linear layout, comes at a cost.  SignWriting currently requires special software; SignWriting cannot be used as ordinary text within normal word processors or other application software. As a work-around, software (SignMaker and Rand Keyboard) is available on the SignWriting website which allows a sign, once assembled with special SignWriting software, to be copied easily as a graphic image into word processing or desktop publishing software.

SignPuddle is a plain-text (ASCII) string representation of signs. It can be stored as plain text anywhere and be replaced by signs with special programs such as the SignWriting Icon Server. An RFC standard draft for it has been proposed, which later evolved into a stricter draft standard known as "Formal Signwriting" (FSW). It can also use Unicode characters instead of ASCII escapes. There is also an experimental TrueType font that uses the SIL Graphite technology to automatically turn these sequences into signs.

Unicode

SignWriting is the first writing system for sign languages to be included in the Unicode Standard. 672 characters were added in the Sutton SignWriting (Unicode block) of Unicode version 8.0 released in June 2015.  This set of characters is based on SignWriting's standardized symbol set and defined character encoding model.

The Unicode Standard only covers the symbol set.  It does not address layout, the positioning of the symbols in two dimensions.  Historically, software has recorded position using Cartesian (X-Y) coordinates for each symbol.  Since Unicode focuses on symbols that make sense in a one-dimensional plain-text context, the number characters required for two-dimensional placement were not included in the Unicode proposal.

The Unicode block for Sutton SignWriting is U+1D800–U+1DAAF:

Current software records each sign as a string of characters in either ASCII or Unicode.  Older software may use XML or a custom binary format to represent a sign.  Formal SignWriting uses ASCII characters to define the two-dimensional layout within a sign and other simple structures.  It would be possible to fully define a sign in Unicode with seventeen additional characters.  With either character set (Unicode or ASCII), the spelling of a sign produces a word that the can be efficiently processed with regular expressions.  These sets are isomorphic.

Accessibility
Sutton has released the International SignWriting Alphabet 2010 under the SIL Open Font License. The symbols of the ISWA 2010 are available as individual SVG or as TrueType Fonts.
 SignWriting 2010 Fonts project on GitHub

Google has released an open type font called Noto Sans SignWriting that supports the SignWriting in Unicode 8 (uni8) specification with modifying characters and facial diacritics.

SignWriting is enabled on Wikimedia Incubator with "The Javascript-based SignWriting Keyboard for Use on Wikimedia and throughout the Web" by Yair Rand.  Test wikis include the ASL Wikipedia on Incubator and the other test wikis of sign languages.

The Sutton SignWriting SignMaker (@sutton-signwriting/signmaker) is a sign editor that can be accessed directly, embedded in an iFrame, and downloaded. It uses both Formal SignWriting in ASCII (FSW) and SignWriting in Unicode (SWU) character sets, along with the associated style string. See draft-slevinski-formal-signwriting for detailed specification.

For modern web and app development, several packages are available on GitHub and NPM.
 @sutton-signwriting/core - a javascript package for node and browsers that supports general processing of the Sutton SignWriting script
 @sutton-signwriting/unicode8 - a javascript package for processing SignWriting in Unicode 8 (uni8) characters
 @sutton-signwriting/font-ttf - a javascript package for the web components and browser that generates SVG and PNG images for individual symbols, complete signs, and vertical paragraphs
 @sutton-signwriting/font-db - a javascript package for node that generates SVG and PNG images for individual symbols, complete signs, and vertical paragraphs
 @sutton-signwriting/sgnw-components - a javascript package of Web Components for individual symbols, symbol palettes, complete signs, and vertical paragraphs
 @sutton-signwriting/signmaker - a javascript package for sign editing page with URL parameters and iFrame messaging

For sign language translation, SignWriting text is a useful abstraction layer between video and the natural language processing of sign language.
The usefulness of SignWriting in natural language processing was validated with a new method of machine translation that has achieved over 30 BLEU.
The conversion of sign language video to SignWriting text is an emerging field with open source options.

Additional machine learning projects are available for handwriting recognition of SignWriting, SignWriting to spoken language, and spoken language to SignWriting. SignWriting is a key component of the efforts to create Google translate for sign language.

See also 

 Other writing systems for sign languages, including:
 ASL-phabet, a minimal script for ASL
 Hamburg Notation System (HamNoSys), a phonetic transcription system for sign languages developed by linguists in Europe
 Si5s, a handwritten script for ASL
 Stokoe notation, a script devised by a pioneer of sign-language linguistics originally for ASL, which has been adapted for other sign languages
 International Movement Writing Alphabet (IMWA)

References

Relevant literature
 Hoffmann-Dilloway, Erika. 2017. Feeling your own (or someone else's) face: Writing signs from the expressive viewpoint. Language & Communication.

External links

  for Sutton SignWriting
 ISWA 2010 HTML Reference
 ISWA 2010 Font Reference
 Modern SignWriting Specifications
 SignWriting Image Server
 Noto SignWriting
 SignWriting MediaWiki Plugin
 Handwritten forms of SignWriting
 SignPuddle Online – Dictionaries and documents
 Dictionary of the Flemish Sign Language (uses SignWriting)
 The King James Bible in SignWriting
 MA thesis A Grammar of SignWriting

Sign language notation
Writing systems introduced in 1974